Transgender pornography is a genre of pornography featuring transsexual or transgender actors. The majority of the genre features trans women, but trans men are sometimes featured. Trans women are most often featured with male partners, but they are also featured with other women, both transgender and cisgender.

Terminology 
It is common in transgender pornography to use terms that are generally regarded as pejorative slurs in the trans community, such as "chicks with dicks", "trannies", or "shemales". Transgender pornographic actress Wendy Williams said she disagreed with activists who thought these sorts of terms are slurs. In 2017, a major trans porn site changed their name from ShemaleYum to GroobyGirls and announced they would no longer use terms that are seen as stigmatizing.

Trans women in pornography are sometimes called "tgirls", the t standing for transgender or transsexual.

Awards 
AVN Award for Transgender Performer of the Year is one of the major industry awards for actors in the genre. Transgender Erotica Awards (formerly Tranny Awards) is the other major award.

Trans women

Viewers of pornography featuring trans women typically identify as heterosexual. Transgender porn has become one of the largest, most popular genres of porn among heterosexual males.

Data from RedTube, a pornographic video hosting site, indicated that as of 2016 and based on the frequency of online searches trans porn was most popular in Brazil, Italy, Argentina, Russia and Spain; the United States ranked at 12th place and within the US trans porn searches were most common in Wyoming.

A spokesman for Evil Angel, a US porn production company, was quoted in 2015 as saying trans porn was the company's most profitable category, commanding premiums of about 20% more than other genres or scenes.

Trans pornographic actresses may be either sexually passive or active with their male co-stars. Some actresses, such as Danni Daniels, usually perform as a "top" or specialize in dominant roles.

Trans men

In 2005, Titan Media released a film titled Cirque Noir starring Buck Angel, marking the first time a trans man had been featured in an all-male film produced by a company specializing in gay male porn.

Cyd St. Vincent founded "Bonus Hole Boys" in 2014, the first FTM gay porn company, in order to "show big-name gay porn stars having sex with trans men and loving it." The formula has found a following among both women and gay men, with the majority of the company's fan-base being gay men. The gay male audience for FTM porn has become a growing niche as more gay men become exposed to the genre.

In January 2018, the major gay porn studio Raw Fuck Club (RFC), released a scene starring Cyd St. Vincent titled "Some Men Have Pussies", becoming one of the few major gay porn companies to feature transgender men. The scene was largely popular, but provoked some controversy. Buck Angel's "Cirque Noir" and Cyd St. Vincent's "Some Men Have Pussies" have been praised as "landmark roles" in the representation of trans men in gay porn "whose magnitude cannot be understated."

As of 2019, gay trans man porn is still a relatively niche genre of pornography with few performers, but the market is growing each year as an audience develops for the genre.

Perception 

Psychologist David J. Ley wrote that the popularity of transgender porn may have various causes, including sexual fluidity and its novelty factor. Author J. Phillips wrote that the "phallic woman...challenges the fixity of our own sexual identity." Neuroscientist Ogi Ogas said that some straight men are interested in porn with trans women because the brain likes "different sexual cues in novel combinations" and that men seem to have a strong interest in penises regardless of sexual orientation.

Some in the LGBT community feel transgender pornography objectifies transgender people. Others argue it can have positive effects. Trans actor Buck Angel said  "I get letters daily from people thanking me about making them feel better about their bodies."

See also 

 Attraction to transgender people
 Transgender sex worker
 Transgender sexuality

References 

 
Pornography by genre
Transgender sexuality
LGBT erotica